Mickaël Glenn Conjungo Taumhas (born 6 May 1969 in Bangui) is a French discus thrower. He formerly represented his birth country of the Central African Republic.

Career
On the regional African level he won a gold medal at the 1993 African Championships, silver medals at the 1995 All-Africa Games and the 2000 African Championships and bronze medals at the 1998 African Championships and 1999 All-Africa Games. He also won silver at the 1994 Jeux de la Francophonie and bronze at the 1997 Jeux de la Francophonie.

He competed at the Summer Olympics in 1992, 1996 and 2000 and the World Championships in 1991, 1993, 1995, 1997 and 1999 without reaching the finals.

His personal best throw is 63.78 metres, achieved in July 1994 in Sorgues. This is the current national record for the Central African Republic. For this country he holds the national record in all throwing events, and even pole vault. His sister, Maria-Joëlle Conjungo, is also a national record holder.

Achievements

References

External links
 
 
All-Africa Games - GBR Athletics
African Championships - GBR Athletics
Francophone Games - GBR Athletics

1969 births
Living people
People from Bangui
French male discus throwers
Central African Republic discus throwers
Athletes (track and field) at the 1992 Summer Olympics
Athletes (track and field) at the 1996 Summer Olympics
Athletes (track and field) at the 2000 Summer Olympics
Olympic athletes of the Central African Republic
World Athletics Championships athletes for the Central African Republic
Central African Republic emigrants to France
Central African Republic male athletes
African Games silver medalists for the Central African Republic
African Games medalists in athletics (track and field)
African Games bronze medalists for the Central African Republic
Athletes (track and field) at the 1995 All-Africa Games
Athletes (track and field) at the 1999 All-Africa Games